Wanda Lesisz (15 July 1926 – 16 July 2017) was a Polish resistance fighter during World War II. She was honoured Righteous Among the Nations for hiding Jews from the Nazis. She married Tadeusz Lesisz., who was also a Resistance fighter. Her father worked for the Polish Army. She and her sisters attended a military school taught by a minister until the age of 15, after she began attending a school run by the wife of the same minister.

While German forces were advancing through pressure, Wanda and her family had to make their journey on an alternate route. Her new home had no windows, no glass, and cracked radiators. This became her new life and, in such, she got a job as a newspaper distributor. However, this quickly changed when she was asked to join the underground, which her mother and sisters were also a part of. Wanda's main job was distributing messages, however she also distributed weapons to other members of the resistance. In addition to this, she assisted an English Beach Jumper who lived with them for a short amount of time, but later was apprehended and killed.

References 

Polish resistance members of World War II
Polish emigrants to the United Kingdom
Polish Righteous Among the Nations
1926 births
2017 deaths